The Armuthsbach is an 18.4-kilometre-long, orographically left-hand tributary of the Ahr in the German states of North Rhine-Westphalia and Rhineland-Palatinate.

Geography

Course 
Its spring lies on the territory of Blankenheim. Flowing in a mainly easterly direction the Armuthsbach passes through the village of Rohr. Below the settlement the stream reaches the state border with Rhineland-Palatinate. As it continues to its mouth, there are no further villages along its course. About 400 metres north of the stream is Hümmel, about 900 metres south is Wershofen.

The Armuthsbach flows through the North Rhine-Westphalian nature reserve of the Armuthsbach and Tributaries (Armuthsbach und Nebenbäche).

The stream descends through 286 metres and has an average riverbed gradient of 15.5 ‰. Its catchment area covers 60.526 km² and its waters drain via the Ahr and Rhine into the North Sea.

Tributaries 
The most important tributary of the Armuthsbach is the 7.7-km-long Buchholz Bach. The following table lists the tributaries of the Armuthsbachs as they are recorded in the waterbody index of the state of North Rhine-Westphalia.

See also
List of rivers of North Rhine-Westphalia

References

External links 
 
 Armuthsbach im AW-wiki

Rivers of the Eifel
Euskirchen (district)
Ahrweiler (district)
Rivers of North Rhine-Westphalia
Rivers of Germany